Balbalan, officially the Municipality of Balbalan  is a 3rd class municipality in the province of Kalinga, Philippines. According to the 2020 census, it has a population of 12,914 people.

History
[Note: The historical note is taken from an article by Scott Magkachi Saboy]

Early beginning

This town draws its name from an ancient practice. It was said that war parties coming from certain areas in northern Kalinga (probably, the ancient place of Salegseg) used to meet by a creek when mapping out their plan of attack against or when regrouping after attacking a certain village. Since they would always wash (balbal, in the local dialect) their blood-stained bodies and weapons in the creek, the place and its adjacent areas came to be known as Balbalan. Since its tribal war days, Balbalan has become one of the most peaceful place in Kalinga as dramatized by the selection of one of its ethnic sub-groups, the Salegseg.

Spanish Era: At the Edge of the World
The Spaniards made at least 10 incursions into the land of the Kalingas from the early 1600s to the late 1800s, four of which were made from the west (Abra) primarily targeting the regions of Banao and Guinaang. Although they succeeded around the mid-1800s in establishing a telegraph station in Balbalasang (where, incidentally, they appointed the noted Banao leader Juan Puyao as a gobernadorcillo or councilor) and subsequently hacking out an Ilocos-Abra-Kalinga-Cagayan trail, they failed to establish a total politico-military foothold in Kalinga.

Prior to the establishment of American rule in Kalinga, the ethnic sub-groups covered by the present geopolitical configuration of Balbalan were, like other Kalinga communities at that time, organized according to an indigenous system or concept of local governance operating within a “bilateral kinship group” circumscribed by semi-permanent territorial boundary.

This period saw the rise of several community leaders often mentioned in Balbalan orature: Sagaoc, Balutoc, Masadao, Gaddawan, Dawegoy, Lang-ayan, Bayudang, Gammong, et al.

American Era: Toward the Mainstream
When the Americans imposed their system of government over the archipelago, the land of the Kalingas became one of the highlights of their so-called “pacification campaign.” On 18 August 1907, Kalinga, then a sub-province of Lepanto-Bontoc, came under the control of Lt. Gov. Walter Franklin Hale who established his seat of government in Lubuagan where he organized the sub-province into four districts: Tinglayan-Tanudan; Balbalan-Pasil; Pinukpuk-Tobog (Tabuk), and Liwan (Rizal).

Exactly a year later, Act 1870 of the Philippine Commission carved the old Mountain Province out of northern Luzon with Kalinga as one of its five sub-provinces. Kalinga was immediately reorganized into five municipal districts — Lubuagan (including Tanudan and Pasil), Balbalan (including Balinciagao), Tabuk (with Liwan or Rizal), Tinglayan, and Pinukpuk — each led by presidents. Among these municipal chiefs was Puyao who served in that capacity for close to 24 years under five subprovincial chief executives: Walter F. Hale (1907–1915), Alex F. Gilfilan (1915), Samuel E. Kane (1915–1919), Tomas Blanco (1918–1923), and Nicasio Balinag (1923–1936). Puyao did not run for office during the first local elections in the area in 1934, and was succeeded by Awingan. Three years later, municipal chief executives became known as “Municipal District Mayors.”

Little is known of the political organization of the municipality during the Japanese occupation of the Philippines, except that in 1942 a Japanese garrison was established in Balbalan, as well as in Lubuagan and in Tabuk.

Post-War Era: Charting a Course
The old Mountain Province was regularized as a “first class province” in 1959 and new local elections were subsequently held. In Balbalan, Pedro Sagalon was elected mayor (Sugguiyao, 23). From the birth of the new Mountain Province on 18 June 1966 to 1988, there is a dearth of records on the succession of leadership in Balbalan. From 1988 to the present, however, government records list the following as mayors: Leonardo Banganan (1988–1992), Edward Calumnag (1992–1995), Rosendo Dakiwag (1995–2001), and Allen J.C. Mangaoang (2001 to 2013).

The present leadership of Balbalan has special significance to those who feared that the death of Juan Puyao in 1948 meant the end of his political bloodline. In the words of Kalinga historian Miguel Sugguiyao (1990, 39):

Geography

Barangays

Balbalan is politically subdivided into 14 barangays. These barangays are headed by elected officials: Barangay Captain, Barangay Council, whose members are called Barangay Councilors. All are elected every three years.

Climate

Demographics

Economy

Government
Balbalan, belonging to the lone congressional district of the province of Kalinga, is governed by a mayor designated as its local chief executive and by a municipal council as its legislative body in accordance with the Local Government Code. The mayor, vice mayor, and the councilors are elected directly by the people through an election which is being held every three years.

Elected officials

See also
 Balbalasang-Balbalan National Park

Notes

References

Works cited

Books
Bacdayan, Albert. The Peace Pact System of the Kalingas in the Modern World. Ann Arbor, MI: University Microfilms, Inc., 1967.
Barton, Roy F. The Kalingas: Their Institutions and Custom Law. Chicago: The University of Chicago Press, 1949.
De Los Reyes, Angelo J. & Aloma M. De Los Reyes, eds. Igorot: A People Who Daily Touch the Earth and Sky. Vol. II. Baguio City: Cordillera Schools Group, 1986.
DILG-CAR. Cordillera Almanac Vol. 1 : Local Government Units. Baguio City: DILG-CAR, 1999.
Dozier, Edward P. Mountain Arbiters: The Changing Life of a Philippine Hill People. Tucson, AZ: The University of Arizona Press, 1966.
The Kalinga of Northern Luzon, Philippines. New York: Holt, Rinehart and Winston, 1967.
Finin Gerard A. The Making of the Igorot: Contours of Cordillera Consciousness. Manila: Ateneo de Manila University Press, 2005.
Jenista, Frank Lawrence. The White Apos: American Governors on the Cordillera Central. Quezon City: New Day Publishers, 1987.
Lawless, Robert. The Social Ecology of the Kalingas of Northern Luzon. Ann Arbor, MI: Xerox University Microfilms, 1975.
Scott, William Henry, ed. German Travelers on the Cordillera (1860–1890). Manila: Filipiniana Book Guild, 1975.
The Discovery of the Igorots: Contacts with the Pagans of Northern Luzon. Quezon City: New Day Publishers, 1974.
Sugguiyao, Miguel. The Kalinga Hilltribe of the Philippines. Manila: ONCC, 1990.

Periodicals
Dannang, Noe. “The Rotary Way of Curbing Vindictive Killings.” The Highland Leader. October 1994, 5.
Scott, William Henry. “Notes on the History of the Mountain Provinces – IV.” University of Baguio Journal, IX-1 (1974): 1-4

External links
 [ Philippine Standard Geographic Code]
Philippine Census Information
Local Governance Performance Management System

Municipalities of Kalinga (province)